PT5 or variants may refer to:
 Pratt & Whitney PT5  a turboprop engine variant of the J57 turbojet engine, given the military designation T57.
 Consolidated XPT-5, an experimental variant of the PT-3 training airplane.
 PT-5, a pre-World War II US Navy PT-boat.
 PT5, a paratriathlon classification.
 Prison Tycoon: Alcatraz (2010 videogame), 5th game in the Prison Tycoon series.